Billy Jack "Spook" Murphy (January 13, 1921 – February 21, 2008) was an American college football player, coach, and athletics administrator. He served as the head football coach at Memphis State University—now known as the University of Memphis—from 1958 to 1971, compiling a record of 91–44–1. Murphy's 1963 team was the school's first undefeated team in 25 years, and Murphy was named national coach of the year. Murphy was also the athletic director at Memphis State from 1966 to 1981. He grew up in Siloam Springs, Arkansas and played college football at Mississippi State University.

Murphy met all eligibility requirements and was first on the 2007 College Football Hall of Fame ballot. In 2022, he was inducted. 

Murphy died in a retirement community in Memphis, Tennessee in 2008.

Head coaching record

References

External links
 

2008 deaths
1921 births
American football halfbacks
Memphis Tigers athletic directors
Memphis Tigers football coaches
Minnesota Golden Gophers football coaches
Mississippi State Bulldogs football coaches
Mississippi State Bulldogs football players
College Football Hall of Fame inductees
People from Crosby County, Texas
People from Siloam Springs, Arkansas
Coaches of American football from Arkansas
Players of American football from Arkansas